Ondřej Pachlopník (born 14 February 2000) is a Czech footballer who currently plays as a midfielder for FC Zbrojovka Brno.

Club career

FC Zbrojovka Brno
He made his professional debut for Zbrojovka Brno in the away match against Chrudim on 2 February 2019, which ended in a win 2:1. He came to the pitch as a substitute in 71st minute and helped his team to win 2:1, although Zbrojovka played in one man less.

References

External links
 Profile at FC Zbrojovka Brno official site
 Profile at FAČR official site

2000 births
Living people
Czech footballers
FC Zbrojovka Brno players
Association football midfielders
Czech National Football League players
FC Viktoria Plzeň players
Czech Republic youth international footballers
Footballers from Brno